A rondel is a circular piece of metal used for protection, as part of a harness of plate armour, or attached to a helmet, breastplate, couter or on a gauntlet.

Rondels most commonly hang off breastplates and cover the armpit, which is a vulnerable point. They may also have been used to steady the jousting lance. In this instance they are commonly known as besagews. They also appear on the back of a type of late medieval helmet known as the armet. Their purpose for this is unknown, though it has been surmised that they may protect strapping, or just be some sort of added protection. Rondels also appear uncommonly on  the metacarpal parts of some historical gauntlet designs, and appear in some period illustrations protecting the side of the head, and the point of the elbow (where a fan may normally be).

See also
Besagew—a kind of rondel for armpit protection
Mirror armour—oriental armour developed from local types of polished rondels, called as "mirrors"

References

External links
 Leg Harness (1400 - 1620) description of historic developments in leg armour

Western plate armour